Mormolyce phyllodes, commonly known as the violin beetle, is a species of ground beetles in the subfamily Lebiinae.

Subspecies
The species may be divided into the following subspecies:

 Mormolyce phyllodes borneensis Gestro, 1875 
 Mormolyce phyllodes engeli Lieftinck & Wiebes, 1968 
 Mormolyce phyllodes phyllodes Hagenbach, 1825

Description
These beetles possess a flat leaf-shaped, shiny black or brown body with distinctive violin-shaped translucent elytra (hence the common name). This characteristic mimicry protects them against predators, while their flat shaped body allow them to dwell in soil cracks or under the bark and leaves of trees. Head and pronotum are very elongated, with long antennae and the legs are long and slender.

Both adults and larvae are predators, feeding on insect larvae. For defense purposes, they secrete the poisonous butyric acid. The larvae live between layers of bracket fungi, genus Polyporus. Their development lasts 8–9 months, while pupation lasts 8–10 weeks. Adults fly from August to November.

Distribution and habitat
This species can be found in rainforests of Southeast Asia (Brunei, Indonesia, Java, Malaysia and Sumatra).

References

Lebiinae
Insects of Indonesia
Insects of Malaysia
Beetles described in 1825